Yolaçan is a village in the Taşova District, Amasya Province, Turkey. Its population is 103 (2021).

References

Villages in Taşova District